The Western luminous roughy (Aulotrachichthys argyrophanus) is a slimehead from the family Trachichthyidae. It is found in the southwest Atlantic, off the Amazon River mouth in northern Brazil.

References

Aulotrachichthys
Fish described in 1961
Fish of the Atlantic Ocean
Fish of Brazil